The 2023 International Court of Justice election will be held in November 2023 at the United Nations Headquarters in New York City. In the set of triennial elections, the General Assembly and the Security Council concurrently elect five judges to the Court for nine-year terms.

Background 
The International Court of Justice (ICJ), based in The Hague, is one of the principal organs of the United Nations. The court consists of 15 judges, with five judges elected every three years. In the case of death or other vacancy, a judge is elected for the remainder of the term. Judges are required to be independent and impartial; they may not exercise any political or administrative function, and do not act as a representative of their home state. Elections of members of the Court are governed by articles 2 through 15 of the Statute of the International Court of Justice.

In February 2024, the terms of five judges will expire: Joan Donoghue of the United States, currently the President of the Court; Kirill Gevorgian of Russia, currently the Vice-President of the Court; Mohamed Bennouna of Morocco; Patrick Robinson of Jamaica; and Hilary Charlesworth of Australia. Each is eligible for re-election.

Nominations 
The U.S. National Group to the Permanent Court of Arbitration intends to nominate Professor Sarah Cleveland, while the Australian National Group will formally nominate current Judge Hilary Charlesworth for re-election when nominations open in early 2023.

References 

International Court of Justice elections
2023 elections in the United States